North, Central American and Caribbean youth bests in the sport of athletics are the all-time best marks set in competition by aged 17 or younger throughout the entire calendar year of the performance and competing for a member nation of the North American, Central American and Caribbean Athletics Association (NACAC). NACAC doesn't maintain an official list for such performances. All bests shown on this list are tracked by statisticians not officially sanctioned by the governing body.

Outdoor
h = hand timing

A = affected by altitude

OT = oversized track (> 200m in circumference)

X = annulled due to doping violation

Mx = Mixed gender race

Wo = Women only race

Boys

Girls

Mixed

Indoor

Boys

Girls

Notes

References

Youth
NACAC
Youth bests
Youth bests